Rodolphe Gasché (born 1938, Luxembourg) holds the Eugenio Donato Chair of Comparative Literature at the University at Buffalo, State University of New York.

Career 
Gasché obtained his doctorate from the Freie Universität Berlin, where he has also taught. Before going to Buffalo he taught at Johns Hopkins University.

Work 
Early in his career, Gasché translated major essays of Jacques Derrida into German. After moving from Paris to Baltimore to take up a post with Johns Hopkins University, Gasché was among a group of young intellectuals who authored pathbreaking articles in the journal "Glyph". The Tain of the Mirror (Cambridge, MA: 1986) located the thought of Derrida within the philosophical tradition (particularly of phenomenology).

Bibliography 
Geophilosophy: On Gilles Deleuze and Felix Guattari's What Is Philosophy?, Evanston, IL.: Northwestern University Press, 2014, pp. 141.
Georges Bataille: Phenomenology and Phantasmatology (Stanford: Stanford University Press, 2012).
Imada Nai Sekai Wo Motomete: Heidegger, Derrida, Löwith, trans. Hiroki Yoshikuni, Tokyo: Getsuyosha Limited, 2012
The Stelliferous Fold: Toward a Virtual Law of Literature's Self-Formation (Bronx, NY: Fordham University Press, 2011).
Europe, Or The Infinite Task (Stanford: Stanford University Press, 2008).
Views and Interviews: On "Deconstruction" in America (Aurora, Colorado: The Davies Group Publishers, 2007).
The Honor of Thinking: Critique, Theory, Philosophy (Stanford: Stanford University Press, 2006).
The Idea of Form: Rethinking Kant's Aesthetics (Stanford: Stanford University Press, 2003).
Of Minimal Things: Studies on the Notion of Relation (Stanford: Stanford University Press, 1999).
The Wild Card of Reading: On Paul de Man (Cambridge, Massachusetts, & London: Harvard University Press, 1998).
Inventions of Difference: On Jacques Derrida (Cambridge, Massachusetts, & London: Harvard University Press, 1994).
The Tain of the Mirror: Derrida and the Philosophy of Reflection (Cambridge, Massachusetts, & London: Harvard University Press, 1986).
System und Metaphorik in der Philosophie von Georges Bataille (Bern: Lang, 1978).
Die hybride Wissenschaft (Stuttgart: Metzler, 1973).

See also 
List of deconstructionists

References

1938 births
Living people
Continental philosophers
20th-century American philosophers